Tonje Roth Berglie (born 11 August 1992) is a Norwegian female handballer who plays for Larvik HK.

Personal life  
Berglie studies to become a psychologist.

References
 

 
Norwegian female handball players
1992 births
Living people
Sportspeople from Tønsberg